Harold Lowell Runnels (March 17, 1924 – August 5, 1980) was a U.S. Representative from New Mexico.

Runnels attended Dallas public schools and Cameron State Agricultural College (now Cemeron University) in Lawton, Oklahoma. He was employed by the Federal Bureau of Investigation in Washington D.C. in 1942. From 1945 to 1951, Runnels was a manager for the Magnolia Amusement Co. in Magnolia, Arkansas. He moved to Lovington, New Mexico in 1951 and became a partner in Southland Supply Co., in 1952. In 1953 he formed Runnels Mud Co. and in 1964 RunCo Acidizing & Fracturing Co. In 1960, he was a founder of the Permian Basin Petroleum Association. He served as a member of the New Mexico Senate from 1960 to 1970, and served as delegate to New Mexico State Democratic conventions from 1960 to 1979.

Runnels was elected as a Democrat to the Ninety-second and to the four succeeding Congresses and served from January 3, 1971, until his death. He died in New York City on August 5, 1980 of respiratory failure while being treated for pleurisy and cancer. He was interred at Rest Haven Memorial Gardens in Lovington, New Mexico.

The Harold Runnels Papers (1971-1980) from his time in the U.S. Congress are held in the Special Collections of Eastern New Mexico University. Within the Golden Student Success Center is the Runnels Room, an art gallery name in Runnels' honor after a portion of his estate was bequeathed to the university.

His son, Mike Runnels, served as Lieutenant Governor of New Mexico from 1983 to 1987.

See also
 List of United States Congress members who died in office (1950–99)

References

Sources

Harold L. Runnels at Find a Grave

1924 births
1980 deaths
Federal Bureau of Investigation agents
Democratic Party New Mexico state senators
Deaths from cancer in New York (state)
People from Dallas
Democratic Party members of the United States House of Representatives from New Mexico
Deaths from respiratory failure
20th-century American politicians
People from Lovington, New Mexico
United States Army Air Forces personnel of World War II
United States Army Air Forces soldiers
United States Army reservists
Cameron University alumni